Take It Off is the fifth studio album by American R&B band Chic, released on Atlantic Records in November 16, 1981. It includes the single "Stage Fright", which reached number 35 on the US R&B chart, but was the first Chic single failing to enter the US Pop charts, and this album only proved to be moderately successful as well, stalling at number 124 on the US albums chart and number 36 on the R&B chart.

Take It Off was one of three albums written and produced by Bernard Edwards and Nile Rodgers in 1981, the other two being Blondie lead singer Debbie Harry's debut solo album Koo Koo and Johnny Mathis' I Love My Lady.

Take It Off was transferred to CD and re-released by Atlantic Records/Warner Music in 1991. It was digitally remastered and reissued by Wounded Bird Records in 2006.

Track listing
All tracks written by Bernard Edwards and Nile Rodgers.

Side A
"Stage Fright" – 3:55 
"Burn Hard" – 5:12
"So Fine" – 4:10
"Flash Back" – 4:28
"Telling Lies" – 2:28

Side B
"Your Love Is Cancelled" – 4:12
"Would You Be My Baby" – 3:34
"Take It Off" – 5:12
"Just Out of Reach" – 3:45 
"Baby Doll" – 3:10

Personnel
 Luci Martin – lead vocals (A1, A2, A5, B3)
 Alfa Anderson – lead vocals (B2, B4)
 Jocelyn Brown – vocals
 Michelle Cobbs – vocals
 Fonzi Thornton – vocals
 Nile Rodgers – guitar; lead vocals (B1)
 Raymond Jones – keyboards
 Rob Sabino – keyboards
 Bernard Edwards – bass guitar; lead vocals (A4, B3, B4)
 Tony Thompson – drums
 Manolo Badrena – percussion
 Sammy Figueroa – percussion
 Roger Squitero – percussion
 Michael Brecker – saxophone
 Ronnie Cuber – saxophone
 Lenny Pickett – saxophone
 Vinny Della Rocca – saxophone
 Randy Brecker – trumpet, flugelhorn
 Ray Maldonado – trumpet, flugelhorn

Production
 Bernard Edwards – producer for Chic Organization Ltd.
 Nile Rodgers – producer for Chic Organization Ltd.
 Bill Scheniman – sound engineer
 Jason Corsaro – sound engineer
 Dennis King – mastering
 Sandi Young – art direction
 Tony Wright – cover art
 Recorded and mixed at The Power Station, NYC.
 Mastered at Atlantic Studios, NYC.

Chart performance

References 

1981 albums
Chic (band) albums
Boogie albums
Atlantic Records albums
Albums produced by Nile Rodgers
Albums produced by Bernard Edwards